Licea is a genus of slime molds belonging to the family Liceidae.

The genus was first described by Heinrich Schrader in 1797.

The genus has a cosmopolitan distribution.

Species:
 Licea inconspicua
 Licea kleistobolus
 Licea parasitica
 Licea pusilla

References

Myxogastria
Amoebozoa genera
Taxa named by Heinrich Schrader (botanist)